Christopher Lloyd (born 1938) is an American actor.

Christopher Lloyd may also refer to:

Christopher Lloyd (art historian) (born 1945), Surveyor of the Queen's Pictures, 1988–2005
Christopher Lloyd (gardener) (1921–2006), author of gardening books
Christopher Lloyd (naval historian) (1906–1986), British naval historian
Christopher Lloyd (TV producer) (born 1960), American TV screenwriter and producer
Chris Lloyd (born 1980), sprinter from Dominica
Christopher Charles Lloyd (born 1982), rapper known as Lloyd Banks, member of G-Unit
Christopher Lloyd (world history author) (born 1968), historian, educationalist and author